The term en femme  is a lexical borrowing of a French phrase. It is used in the transgender and crossdressing community to describe the act of wearing feminine clothing or expressing a stereotypically feminine personality. The term is borrowed from the modern French phrase en  femme meaning "as a woman." Most crossdressers also use a female name whilst en femme; that is their "femme name". In the cross-dressing community the persona a man adopts when he dresses as a woman is known as his "femme self".

In 1987, Robyn Dormer started a magazine called "En Femme" that was "for the transvestite, transsexual, crossdresser, and female impersonator." The magazine ran until 1991.

See also 

Effeminacy
En homme
Drag (clothing)
Femme
Femminiello
 List of transgender-related topics
 List of transgender-rights organizations

References

External links 
 
 The EnFemme Archives
 En Femme Magazine No. 1, Digital Transgender Archive

Cross-dressing
Trans women
LGBT slang
French words and phrases